The city of Vantaa, Finland, is divided into 60 districts. These districts are grouped among seven major regions.

List of districts
This is a list of the 60 districts of Vantaa, grouped among their respective major regions and ordered alphabetically.

Aviapolis area
 Lentokenttä
 Pakkala
 Tammisto
 Veromies
 Viinikkala
 Ylästö

Hakunila (Håkansböle) area
 Hakunila
 Itä-Hakkila
 Kuninkaanmäki
 Länsimäki
 Länsisalmi
 Ojanko
 Rajakylä
 Sotunki
 Vaarala

Kivistö area
 Keimola
 Kiila
 Kivistö
 Lapinkylä
 Luhtaanmäki
 Myllymäki
 Piispankylä
 Riipilä
 Seutula
 Vestra

Koivukylä (Björkby) area
 Asola
 Havukoski
 Ilola
 Koivukylä
 Päiväkumpu
 Rekola

Korso area
 Jokivarsi
 Korso
 Leppäkorpi
 Matari
 Metsola
 Mikkola
 Nikinmäki
 Vallinoja
 Vierumäki

Myyrmäki (Myrbacka) area
 Askisto
 Hämeenkylä
 Hämevaara
 Kaivoksela
 Linnainen
 Martinlaakso
 Myyrmäki
 Petikko
 Vantaanlaakso
 Vapaala
 Varisto

Tikkurila (Dickursby) area
 Hakkila
 Helsingin pitäjän kirkonkylä
 Hiekkaharju
 Jokiniemi
 Koivuhaka
 Kuninkaala
 Ruskeasanta
 Simonkylä
 Tikkurila
 Viertola

References

 
Vantaa